Mersudin Ahmetović (born 19 March 1985) is a Bosnian professional footballer who plays as a striker for Bosnian Premier League club Igman Konjic.

Club career

Early career
Ahmetović started his professional football career at hometown club Sloboda Tuzla in 2003. In the summer of 2008 he left Sloboda and joined Russian club Rostov. After two seasons in Rostov and breaking in to the first team spot, he left for Volga Nizhny Novgorod where he had a good start, but got sidelined in his second season with the club. In February 2013, Ahmetović signed a contract with Salyut Belgorod. He left Belgorod in February 2014.

Zhetsyu
In February 2014, Ahmetović joined Zhetysu, but shortly after, in December 2014, he left the club.

Sloboda Tuzla
In January 2015, he came back to Bosnia to help Sloboda avoid relegation. In June 2015, Sloboda declared that Ahmetović was to stay for another year in the club. After that year, in 2016 he left Sloboda.

Sarajevo
After leaving Sloboda in June 2016, Ahmetović went to Sarajevo. Currently, Ahmetović has in 104 league games scored 51 goals for Sarajevo and has been the club's best goalscorer for the past four seasons. On 8 January 2018, he signed a new contract with Sarajevo, which was due to keep him at the club until the summer of 2020. On 3 May 2019, in his 100th appearance for Sarajevo, Ahmetović scored a goal in Sarajevo's 5–0 home league win against Čelik Zenica.

He won his first trophy with the club on 15 May 2019, after Sarajevo beat Široki Brijeg in the final and won the 2018–19 Bosnian Cup. Three days after the cup final, on 18 May 2019, Ahmetović also won the league title with Sarajevo after the club beat Zvijezda 09 4–0 at home. On 23 May 2019, he was named the Bosnian Premier League Player of the 2018–19 Season. On 2 November 2019, Sarajevo beat Široki Brijeg at home 3–0 in a league game, with Ahmetović scoring all the goals, securing himself a hat-trick. Ahmetović once again extended his contract with Sarajevo on 12 November 2019, signing a two year contract extension until 2021. He scored a goal in his team's 3–1, home league Sarajevo derby defeat against Željezničar on 30 November 2019. Ahmetović scored another hat-trick, this time in a 6–2 league win against Tuzla City on 22 February 2020.

He won his second league title with Sarajevo and became the league top goalscorer on 1 June 2020, though after the 2019–20 Bosnian Premier League season was ended abruptly due to the COVID-19 pandemic in Bosnia and Herzegovina and after which Sarajevo were by default crowned league champions for a second consecutive time.

On 19 July 2020, the club revealed that Ahmetović fractured his ribs in a pre-season game against his former club Sloboda four days earlier. He scored his first goal for Sarajevo in the 2020–21 season in a league win against Tuzla City on 12 August 2020.

In October 2020, Ahmetović injured his cruciate ligament, forcing him out of action until the end of the season.

Igman Konjic
On 22 January 2023, Ahmetović left Sarajevo and joined relegation threatened Igman Konjic on a free transfer. He debuted and scored his first goal for the club in a league game against Željezničar on 25 February 2023.

International career
Ahmetović made his international debut  for Bosnia and Herzegovina in a friendly 0–0 tie with the USA on 28 January 2018. His second appearance came against Mexico in also a friendly 1–0 loss on 1 February 2018. In both games Ahmetović was a starter.

Personal life
Ahmetović's look bears a strong resemblance to that of famous Swedish forward Zlatan Ibrahimović who is also of Bosnian descent himself, they also share a similar style of play.

Career statistics

Club

International

Honours
Sarajevo
Bosnian Premier League: 2018–19, 2019–20
Bosnian Cup: 2018–19, 2020–21

Individual
Bosnian Premier League Player of the Season: 2018–19
Bosnian Premier League Top Goalscorer: 2019–20 (13 goals)

References

External links

Mersudin Ahmetović at Sofascore

1985 births
Living people
Sportspeople from Tuzla
Association football forwards
Bosnia and Herzegovina footballers
Bosnia and Herzegovina international footballers
FK Sloboda Tuzla players
FC Rostov players
FC Volga Nizhny Novgorod players
FC Salyut Belgorod players
FC Zhetysu players
FK Sarajevo players
FK Igman Konjic players
Premier League of Bosnia and Herzegovina players
Russian First League players
Russian Premier League players
Kazakhstan Premier League players
Bosnia and Herzegovina expatriate footballers
Expatriate footballers in Russia
Bosnia and Herzegovina expatriate sportspeople in Russia
Expatriate footballers in Kazakhstan
Bosnia and Herzegovina expatriate sportspeople in Kazakhstan